The Slave Market is a 1917 American adventure silent film directed by Hugh Ford and written by Clara Beranger and Frederic Arnold Kummer. Starring Pauline Frederick, Thomas Meighan, Al Hart, Ruby Hoffman and Wellington A. Playter, it was released on January 1, 1917, by Paramount Pictures.

This film stars with

Cast 
Pauline Frederick as Ramona
Thomas Meighan as John Barton
Al Hart as Firebrand 
Ruby Hoffman as Anna
Wellington A. Playter as Portuguese Joe

References

External links 
 

1917 films
American adventure films
1917 adventure films
Paramount Pictures films
Films directed by Hugh Ford
American black-and-white films
American silent feature films
1910s English-language films
1910s American films
Silent adventure films